The Kyeema airline crash occurred on 25 October 1938 when the Australian National Airways Douglas DC-2 Kyeema, tail number VH-UYC, flying from Adelaide to Melbourne, commenced final approach to Essendon Airport through heavy fog and crashed into the western slopes of Mount Dandenong, also known as Mount Corhanwarrabul, killing all 18 on board instantly.

Crash summary
The flight took off from Adelaide at 11:22. As a result, the flight crew mistakenly identified Sunbury as Daylesford through a gap in the clouds, leading them to believe that they were  behind where they actually were on their flight plan.

Had the flight crew cross-referenced their ground speed with previous landmarks, they would likely have realised that they were not where they thought they were. Instead, they overshot Essendon and, unable to see through the heavy fog, crashed into Mount Dandenong a few hundred metres from the summit.

Exactly what happened in the last few minutes before the crash is disputed. There are claims that the pilots may have seen the mountain coming and tried to turn the aircraft away, inadvertently making the situation worse by adjusting from a flight path through a gap between two peaks to a path directly into one of them.

There is also strong evidence that the pilots were becoming unsure of their position. According to Macarthur Jobs book, Disaster in the Dandenongs, the radio operator had requested the controller at Essendon give them a radio bearing. Essendon had acknowledged and told them to leave their transmitter on, but the signal stopped and no further contact was made. It is thought that is the moment Kyeema hit the mountain.

Passengers and crew

There were 18 people on board the DC-2: 14 passengers, the captain, the first officer, an air hostess, and a cadet pilot who operated the radio during the flight.

Among the passengers was Australian Member of Parliament, Charles Hawker.

Aftermath
By public demand a Royal Commission into the cause of the disaster was established, and the Australian Federal Government appointed an Air Accident Investigation Committee under the Chairmanship of Colonel T. Murdoch DSO, VCE with the public enquiry commencing on 30 October 1938. Because of the crash, regulations were passed which require flight checking officers to monitor the flights of aeroplanes and advise on such things as position, weather, and alternative landing options. Also implementation of a 33 MHz radio range system was recommended to provide pilots with accurate information on their course. Eric Harrison (RAAF officer) was a member of the court of inquiry into the crash on 25 October of the Douglas DC-2 airliner Kyeema. The inquiry's report singled out Major Melville Langslow, Finance Member on both the Civil Aviation Board and the RAAF Air Board, for criticism over cost-cutting measures that had held up trials of safety beacons designed for such eventualities. According to Air Force historian Chris Coulthard-Clark, when Langslow was appointed Secretary at the Department of Air in November the following year, he went out of his way to "make life difficult" for Harrison, causing "bitterness and friction within the department", and necessitating the Chief of the Air Staff, Air Vice Marshal Stanley Goble, to take steps to shield the safety inspector from the new Secretary's ire.

It was not until 40 years after the crash that a memorial to the Kyeema and its eighteen passengers was created at the crash site.

References

AWA Ltd history files 17–19 King St Airport West, Victoria 1940.

External links
 Hugo Gramp Bio
 Charles Hawker Bio 
 CASA Doc

Aviation accidents and incidents in Victoria (Australia)
1930s in Victoria (Australia)
Kyeema Crash
Kyeema crash
Kyeema crash
Australian National Airways accidents and incidents
Accidents and incidents involving the Douglas DC-2
Disasters in Victoria (Australia)
Airliner accidents and incidents involving controlled flight into terrain
1938 disasters in Australia